Sing Slowly Sisters was to have been Robin Gibb's second studio album. Recorded in 1970, the album was finally released in 2015. The album was produced by Gibb and his manager Vic Lewis.

Information
Sing Slowly Sisters was recorded in March 7 to June 23, 1970 and later in July in London. Sing Slowly Sisters began on March just after 1969's "Stairway To Dreamland" was released. On the November 1969 sessions, the songs "I've Been Hurt", "Cold Be My Days" and "Irons in the Fire" were recorded without a rhythm section, with just Gibb's vocals and an orchestra arranged by Kenny Clayton. The song "Avalanche" was later reworked for the 50 St. Catherine's Drive sessions and released in 2014 ((OH Gibb)). Related session outtake, "Great Caesar's Ghost" was declared by Gibb as his next single but was not released, and the song was received by Atlantic Records, although only one copy. While the title track, "Sing Slowly Sisters" was also declared as the next single.

The song "Cold Be My Days" was written about the place Shipston-on-Stour, Warwickshire; to wit "Cold be my days in Shipston-on-Stour".  He stated in a BBC Radio 4 interview in May 2007 that this relates to his youthful experiences, riding horses with his brother Barry.

The tracks now appear on the posthumous boxed set Saved by the Bell: The Collected Works of Robin Gibb 1968–1970.

Aftermath
The bootleg Sing Slowly Sisters (Europe) included songs recorded during the session but not included on the final line-up of the album; "The Flag I Flew", "Return to Austria" and "Engines, Aeroplanes". Another bootleg of the album called The Complete Sing Slowly Sisters (Hong Kong) features unreleased songs from 1969's Robin's Reign sessions; "Janice" and "You're Going Away". And another bootleg copy of Sing Slowly Sisters includes mono versions of "One Million Years" and "Weekend".

AllMusic critic Richie Unterberger describes "Very Special Day" and "Iron in the Fire" as "eerie beauty", and "Janice" with "You're Going Away" as a shaky church-like organ. According to critic Dave Furgess "C'Lest La Vie, Au Revoir" is a killer song.

Track listing
This may be the original song order for Gibb's second album.

Personnel
Robin Gibb – vocals, guitar, piano, organ, producer
Kenny Clayton  – orchestral arrangement
Vic Lewis  – producer

References

Unreleased albums
Robin Gibb albums
Baroque pop albums